Jackson: My Life... Your Fault is a 1995 gay-themed film directed by Duncan Roy starring Benjamin Soames and Alan Gilchrist.

Plot
Jackson (Benjamin Soames) has lived sheltered with his mother since his father's death when he was a little boy. He remembers the event from childhood, and is still troubled by it. His mother (Georgina Hale), is over-protective, and plays upon Jackson's emotions to keep him tied to her. On meeting an attractive policeman, he needs to decide whether to grow up or not.

External links

1995 films
British LGBT-related films
1990s English-language films
1990s British films